Edward C. Stringer (born 1935) is a retired Associate Justice of the Minnesota Supreme Court.   A graduate of Amherst College and the University of Minnesota Law School, he authored a number of opinions as a Justice.   He is now in private law practice in Minnesota.

References 

University of Minnesota Law School alumni
Amherst College alumni
Minnesota lawyers
Justices of the Minnesota Supreme Court
Living people
1935 births